Socialist Democratic Party may refer to:

 Kurdistan Socialist Democratic Party
 Lithuanian Popular Socialist Democratic Party
 Mongolian New Socialist Democratic Party
 Russian Socialist Democratic Party
 Socialist Democratic Party (Canada)
 Socialist Democratic Party (Chile)
 Socialist Democratic Party (Japan)
 Socialist Democratic Party (Turkey)
 Socialist Democratic Party (India)
 Social Democratic Party of Germany
 Social Democratic Party in the GDR
 Social Democratic Party (Bosnia and Herzegovina)
 Social Democratic Party (Croatia)

See also
 Democratic Socialist Party (disambiguation)
 Social Democratic Party
 Socialist Party (disambiguation)
 Party of Democratic Socialism (disambiguation)
 Socialist Democrat Party, Peru